Shahrokh François Shariat (born September 20, 1973) is currently professor and chairman of the Department of Urology, Medical University of Vienna, Vienna General Hospital, Vienna, Austria. He is also adjunct professor of urology at Weill Cornell Medical Center, New York, NY; adjunct professor of urology at the University of Texas Southwestern Medical Center, Dallas, TX, USA; adjunct professor of urology at the Faculty of Medicine, Charles University, Prague, CZ; adjunct professor of urology at I.M. Sechenov First Moscow State Medical University, Moscow, RU; honorary professor of urology, University of Jordan, Amman, JO; doctor honoris causa, Carol Davila University of Medicine and Pharmacy, Bucharest, RO; and doctor honoris causa, Semmelweis University, Budapest, Hungary. He has published more than 1500 peer-reviewed research papers, more than 600 non-peer-reviewed papers, and 26 book chapters.
Shahrokh Shariat specializes in treating urologic malignancies. He has been voted as the most influential urologist in 2020 and also the most cited prostate cancer researcher in the German speaking area.

Awards and memberships
Shahrokh Shariat is the recipient of various national and international awards. He has, for example, received the prestigious Crystal Matula Award from the European Urological Association and the Gold Cystoscope 2017 from the American Urological Association. He is a member of 25 academic societies and editorial board of 26 scientific journals.
In addition, he is an editorial board member of European Urology, BJU International, World Journal of Urology, Current Opinion in Urology (editor in chief), and Immunotherapy among others. Dr. Shariat also reviews grant proposals for cancer research foundations and paper submissions for many journals, heads a medical charity for refugees and is on the medical advisory board for two other charities. He joined in 2010 the New York Presbyterian Hospital and Weill Cornell Medical Center in New York, NY.

Research and areas of focus
As a specialist for treating urological cancers Shahrokh Shariat is the holder of four patents stemming from his research into prostate cancer and bladder cancer. Furthermore, he is currently spearheading several collaborative multicenter groups (Bladder Cancer Research Consortium, The Bladder Cancer Detection Group, and The Upper Tract Urothelial Carcinoma Collaboration) and prospective clinical trials.

Dr. Shariat's research focuses on the following areas:
 Translational research in robotic prostatectomy and prostate cancer
 Translational research in bladder cancer and upper tract urothelial carcinoma
 Gene, vaccine and immuno therapies for urologic diseases with focus on bladder and prostate cancers
 Minimal invasive instrumental treatment modalities for BPH and prostate cancer.

References

External links
 Department of Urology at the Medical University of Vienna
 Department of Urology at Weill Cornell Medical Center
 Weill Cornell Medical Center website
Curriculum vitae at Open Medical Institute 
 Google Scholar

American urologists
American surgeons
American oncologists
Medical educators
American educators
Cancer researchers
Living people
American people of Iranian descent
1973 births